Uriyadi is a Malayalam-language thriller comedy-drama film directed by A.J Varghese. The film stars Sreenivasan, Siddique, Vineeth Mohan, Baiju Santhosh, Aju Varghese and others, where Karthik Jogesh is the editor, the cinematography is by Jemin J Ayyaneth, while the original score and soundtrack are composed by Ishaan Dev. The film was released on 17 January 2020.

Cast
Sreenivasan as Additional SI Padmanabhan Pilla / Pappettan
Siddique as SI Ravikumar
Indrans as Head Constable Panchavarnaksharan Pilla
Aju Varghese as Ambili
Vineeth Mohan as Rahul Ravikumar
Baiju Santhosh as Head Constable Mathayi Sunil
Sreejith Ravi as Gunman Subair
Prem Kumar as Balaraman, Home Minister of Kerala
Sreelakshmi as Kavitha Ravikumar
Manasa Radhakrishnan as Renuka Ravikumar 
Sudhi Koppa as Fireman Mrithul
Arya as Constable Shiny Mathayi
Sethu Lakshmi as Bavani Amma
Bijukuttan as Rajanikanth Vedivecham kovil
Raj Kiran Thomas as Alexander Idicula IPS, City Police Commissioner-Trivandrum
Viji as Saira, Subair's wife
Balaji Sarma as News Reader Arvind Aasamyi
Parvathi Shon
Kalyani Nair
Pradeep Kottayam
Noby Marcose
Azeez Nedumangad as Uthaman

Production
Principal photography began on 30 November 2018 at Police Headquarters, Thiruvananthapuram, Kerala. And the audio launch was conducted at the capital city of Kerala

References

External links
 

2020s Malayalam-language films
Indian comedy thriller films
Fictional portrayals of the Kerala Police
Films shot in Thiruvananthapuram
2020 comedy-drama films
2020 thriller drama films
2020s comedy thriller films